List of men's doubles Grand Slam tournament champions in tennis:

Ken McGregor and Frank Sedgman are the only doubles players and team to achieve a Grand Slam, doing so in 1951, (the Bryans won four consecutive majors, but over the course of two calendar years), and their seven consecutive major titles remain the longest title streak in men's doubles major history.

A total of five players have a completed the career Golden Slam by winning all four majors and an Olympic gold medal during their respective careers: Bob Bryan, Mike Bryan (see also Bryan brothers), Daniel Nestor, Todd Woodbridge and Mark Woodforde (see also The Woodies).

Champions by year

Champions list

Most Grand Slam doubles titles

Individual

Team

Grand Slam achievements

Grand Slam 
Players who held all four Grand Slam titles simultaneously (in a calendar year).

Non-calendar year Grand Slam 
Players who held all four Grand Slam titles simultaneously (not in a calendar year).

Career Grand Slam
Players who won all four Grand Slam titles over the course of their careers.

Individual

Team

Career Golden Slam 
Players who won all four Grand Slam titles and the Olympic gold medal over the course of their careers.

Career Super Slam 
Players who won all four Grand Slam titles, the Olympic gold medal and the Tour Finals over the course of their careers.
 The event at which the Career Super Slam was completed indicated in bold.

Multiples titles in a season

Three titles

Two titles

Tournament stats

Most titles per tournament

Most consecutive titles

Overall record

At one tournament

Grand slam titles by decade
 Top titlists per decade indicated in bold.

1880s

1890s

1900s

1910s

1920s

1930s

1940s

1950s

1960s

1970s

1980s

1990s

2000s

2010s

2020s

Grand Slam titles by country 
Note: Titles, won by a team of players from same country, count as one title, not two.

All-time

Open Era

See also

 List of Grand Slam–related tennis records
 Lists of tennis records and statistics
 List of Grand Slam men's singles champions
 List of Grand Slam women's singles champions
 List of Grand Slam women's doubles champions
 List of Grand Slam mixed doubles champions
 List of men's Grand Slam, Olympic and ATP Tour Finals and Masters Series doubles champions

References

External links 
 US Open men's doubles champions

Men
Grand Slam Men's Doubles champions
 
Grand Slam